"Can't Get You Off My Mind" is a song written and recorded by American singer and songwriter Lenny Kravitz and released in February 1996, as the third single from his fourth studio album, Circus (1995). The song was later included in the albums Greatest Hits (2000) and Lenny (2001) as a bonus track. There are two versions of the music video for the song: one was directed by Matthew Rolston, the other by Jim Gable.

Background
The song was inspired by Kravitz's missing his then-girlfriend while being on tour. Also, he missed his mother who died in December 1995. He explained to The Guardian that he envisioned the song  while he stayed at the Royalton hotel in New York. The song was initially called "The Country Song." Kravitz also said to Q, "...lyric was not a pastiche, man. It came out of me naturally, just as all my lyrics do. I don't analyze songwriting, I simply write... And anyway, when you are on tour a lot, as I was, life is a lonely highway, and I did get lonely out there on the open road, OK?"</ref></ref> In the video when Kravitz can be seen speaking on the phone, it is Fiona Apple on the other end of the line.

Reception
Daina Darzin from Cash Box noted that Kravitz "is positively countrified on this languid, pretty ballad, which turns gracefully soulful in midstream. Mellifluous vocals, gently twimng harmonies and easy-going, soaring instruments make this a track that could work on any number of radio formats." CD Review stated, "Kravitz is inspired by a lot more than just Jimi Hendrix and Sly Stone, and the second half of Circus slows down to accommodate a little mood and melody . But the lovey "Can't Get You Off My Mind” has a little too calculated country feel ". Rob Wagner of The Tech added, "Obviously, Kravitz's touring with the Rolling Stones has greatly influenced him. His song "Can't Get You Off My Mind" steals some chords from "Wild Horses" by the Stones. I kept expecting to hear Mick Jagger jump in." Kevin Powell of Vibe wrote, "With its country western texture, the song feels distant, as if Kravitz were somewhere deep in the sticks, chilling, dreaming about a woman he'd met at a local bar."

Track listing

Charts

References

External links
 

Lenny Kravitz songs
1996 songs
Songs written by Lenny Kravitz